Abbott Seamount is a seamount lying within the Hawaiian-Emperor seamount chain in the northern Pacific Ocean. It erupted 36-40 million years ago.

Position is 31° 48' 00" N, 174° 18' 00" E

See also
List of volcanoes in the Hawaiian – Emperor seamount chain

References

Hawaiian–Emperor seamount chain
Seamounts of the Pacific Ocean
Guyots
Hotspot volcanoes
Eocene volcanoes
Paleogene Oceania